This is a list of piano composers.

Baroque period 

 Domenico Alberti (1710–1740)
 Johann Sebastian Bach (1685–1750)
 François Couperin (1668–1733)
 Louis-Claude Daquin (1694–1772)
 Baldassare Galuppi (1706–1785)
 Lodovico Giustini (1685–1743)
 Christoph Graupner (1683–1760)
 George Frideric Handel (1685–1759)
 Giovanni Benedetto Platti (1697–1763)
 Henry Purcell (1659–1695)
 Jean-Philippe Rameau (1683–1764)
 Domenico Scarlatti (1685–1757)
 Georg Philipp Telemann (1681–1767)
 Antonio Vivaldi (1678–1741)

Classical period 

 Louis Adam (1758–1848)
 Carl Philipp Emanuel Bach (1714–1788)
 Johann Christian Bach (1735–1782)
 Johann Christoph Friedrich Bach (1732–1795)
 Wilhelm Friedemann Bach (1710–1784)
 Carlos Baguer (1768-1808)
 Franz Ignaz Beck (1734–1809)
 Ludwig van Beethoven (1770–1827)
 Georg Benda (1722–1795)
 Ludwig Berger (1777–1839)
 João Domingos Bomtempo (1775–1842)
 Domenico Cimarosa (1749–1801)
 Muzio Clementi (1752–1832)
 Philip Cogan (1750–1833)
 Johann Baptist Cramer (1771–1858)
 Franz Danzi (1763–1826)
 Carl Ditters von Dittersdorf (1739–1799)
 František Xaver Dušek (1731–1799)
 Jan Ladislav Dussek (1760–1812)
 Anton Eberl (1765–1807)
 Józef Elsner (1769–1854)
 Joseph Leopold Eybler (1765–1846)
 Emanuel Aloys Förster (1748–1823)
 Joseph Gelinek (1758–1825)
 Johann Wilhelm Hässler (1747–1822)
 Joseph Haydn (1732–1809)
 Franz Anton Hoffmeister (1754–1812)
 Johann Nepomuk Hummel (1778–1837)
 Hyacinthe Jadin (1776–1800)
 Leopold Kozeluch (1747–1818)
 Joseph Martin Kraus (1756–1792)
 Franz Krommer (1759–1831)
 Nikolaus von Krufft (1779–1818)
 Joseph Küffner (1776–1856)
 Francesca Lebrun (1756–1791)
 Étienne Méhul (1763–1817)
 Leopold Mozart (1719–1787)
 Wolfgang Amadeus Mozart (1756–1791)
 August Eberhard Müller (1767–1817)
 Josef Mysliveček (1737–1781)
 Johann Gottlieb Naumann (1741–1801)
 Christian Gottlob Neefe (1748–1798)
 Sigismund von Neukomm (1778–1858)
 Giovanni Paisiello (1740–1816)
 Ignaz Pleyel (1757–1831)
 Johann Friedrich Reichardt (1752–1814)
 Anton Reicha (1770–1836)
 Antonio Rosetti (1750–1792)
 Friedrich Wilhelm Rust (1739–1796)
 Antonio Salieri (1750–1825)
 Johann Samuel Schroeter (1753–1788)
 Antonio Soler (1729–1783)
 Fernando Sor (1778–1839)
 Daniel Steibelt (1765–1823)
 Johann Franz Xaver Sterkel (1750–1817)
 Johann Baptist Wanhal (1739–1813)
 Václav Jan Tomášek (1774–1850)
 Daniel Gottlob Türk (1750–1813)
 Samuel Wesley (1766–1837)
 Christoph Ernst Friedrich Weyse (1774–1842)
 Johann Wilhelm Wilms (1772–1847)
 Joseph Wölfl (1773–1812)
 Paul Wranitzky (1756–1808)

Romantic period 

 Charles-Valentin Alkan (1813–1888)
 Anton Arensky (1861–1906)
 Tekla Bądarzewska (1829/1834 – 1861)
 Mily Balakirev (1837–1910)
 Friedrich Baumfelder (1836–1916)
 Amy Beach (1867–1944)
 Franz Bendel (1832–1874)
 William Sterndale Bennett (1816–1875)
 Peter Benoit (1834–1901)
 Wilhelm Berger (1861–1911)
 Henri Bertini (1798–1876)
 Felix Blumenfeld (1863–1931)
 Charles Samuel Bovy-Lysberg (1821–1873)
 Johannes Brahms (1833–1897)
 Friedrich Burgmüller (1806–1874)
 Hans von Bülow (1830–1894)
 Ignacio Cervantes (1847–1905)
 Emmanuel Chabrier (1841–1894)
 Cécile Chaminade (1857–1944)
 Frédéric Chopin (1810–1849)
 Aloÿs Claussmann (1850–1926)
 Carl Czerny (1791–1857)
 Eugen d'Albert (1864–1932)
 Élie-Miriam Delaborde (1839–1913)
 Charles Delioux (1825–1915)
 Anton Diabelli (1781–1858)
 Theodor Döhler (1814–1856)
 Gaetano Donizetti (1797–1848)
 Alexander Dreyschock (1818–1869)
 Felix Dreyschock (1860–1906)
 Antonín Dvořák (1841–1904)
 Michele Esposito (1855–1929)
 Gabriel Fauré (1845–1924)
 Zdeněk Fibich (1850-1900)
 John Field (1782–1837)
 Julian Fontana (1810–1869)
 Adolfo Fumagalli (1828–1856)
 Eugene Gayrhos (1843–1909)
 Mikhail Glinka (1804–1857)
 Henri Gobbi (1842–1920)
 Benjamin Godard (1849–1895)
 Louis Moreau Gottschalk (1829–1869)
 Edvard Grieg (1843–1907)
 Agathe Backer Grøndahl (1847-1907)
 Cornelius Gurlitt (1820–1901)
 Adolphe Gutmann (1819–1882)
 Charles-Louis Hanon (1819–1900)
 Stephen Heller (1813–1888)
 Swan Hennessy (1866–1929)
 Adolf von Henselt (1814–1889)
 Ferdinand Hérold (1791–1833)
 Henri Herz (1803–1888)
 Franz Hitz (1828–1891)
 Ferdinand Hiller (1811–1885)
 Franz Hünten (1792–1878)
 Alfred Jaëll (1832–1882)
 Marie Jaëll (1846-1925)
 Friedrich Kalkbrenner (1785–1849)
 Jan Kalivoda (1801–1866)
 Joseph Christoph Kessler (1800–1872)
 Theodor Kirchner (1823–1903)
 Anton de Kontski (1817–1899)
 Wilhelm Kuhe (1823–1912)
 Friedrich Kuhlau (1786–1832)
 Theodor Kullak (1818–1882)
 Franz Lachner (1803–1890)
 Théodore Lack (1846–1921)
 Franz Liszt (1811–1886)
 Henry Litolff (1818–1891)
 Sergei Lyapunov (1859–1924)
 Mykola Lysenko (1842-1912)
 Edward MacDowell (1860–1908)
 George Alexander Macfarren (1813–1887)
 Désiré Magnus (1828–1884)
 Antoine François Marmontel (1816–1898)
 William Mason (1829–1908)
 Fanny Mendelssohn (1805–1847)
 Felix Mendelssohn (1809–1847)
 Amédée Méreaux (1802–1874)
 Aleksander Michalowski (1851–1938)
 Ignaz Moscheles (1794–1870)
 Moritz Moszkowski (1854–1925)
 Franz Xaver Mozart (1791–1844)
 Modest Mussorgsky (1839–1881)
 Vítězslav Novák (1870–1949)
 Joseph O'Kelly (1828–1885)
 Arthur O'Leary (1834–1919)
 George Onslow (1784–1853)
 Paul Pabst (1854–1897)
 Jan Gerard Palm (1831–1906)
 Cipriani Potter (1792–1871)
 Émile Prudent (1817–1863)
 Alfred Quidant (1815–1893)
 Sergei Rachmaninoff (1873–1943)
 Joachim Raff (1822–1882)
 Max Reger (1873–1916)
 Carl Reinecke (1824–1910)
 Julius Reubke (1834–1858)
 Josef Rheinberger (1819-1901)
 Ferdinand Ries (1784-1838)
 Julius Rietz (1812–1877)
 Nikolai Rimsky-Korsakov (1844–1908)
 Anton Rubinstein (1829–1894)
 Camille Saint-Saëns (1835–1921)
 Xaver Scharwenka (1850–1924)
 Aloys Schmitt (1788–1866)
 Friedrich Schneider (1786–1853)
 Franz Schubert (1797–1828)
 Julius Schulhoff (1825–1898)
 Clara Schumann (1819–1896)
 Robert Schumann (1810–1856)
 Ludvig Schytte (1848–1909)
 Giovanni Sgambati (1841–1914)
 Jean Sibelius (1865–1957)
 Bedřich Smetana (1824–1884)
 Sydney Smith (1839–1889)
 Charles Villiers Stanford (1852–1924)
 Camille-Marie Stamaty (1811–1870)
 Wilhelm Taubert (1811–1891)
 Karl Tausig (1841–1871)
 Pyotr Ilyich Tchaikovsky (1840–1893)
 Thomas Tellefsen (1823–1874)
 Sigismond Thalberg (1812–1871)
 Jan Václav Voříšek (1791–1825)
 Richard Wagner (1813–1883)
 Carl Maria von Weber (1786–1826)
 Józef Wieniawski (1837–1912)
 Aleksander Zarzycki (1834–1895)
 Władysław Żeleński (1837–1921)

20th century

Contemporary 

 Philip Aaberg (born 1949)
 Thomas Adès (born 1971)
 Vladimir Anisimoff (born 1950)
 Lera Auerbach (born 1973)
 Nicolas Bacri (born 1961)
 Rich Batsford (born 1969)
 Giorgio Battistelli (born 1953)
 Jason Charles Beck (born 1972)
 Luciano Berio (1925–2003)
 Bart Berman (born 1938)
 Dave Brubeck (1920–2012)
 Dimitrije Bužarovski (born 1952)
 Cornelius Cardew (1936–1981)
 Roberto Carnevale (born 1966)
 Unsuk Chin (born 1961)
 Artur Cimirro (born 1982)
 Aldo Clementi (1925–2011)
 Julian Cochran (born 1974)
 Chick Corea (1941–2021)
 George Crumb (1929–2022)
 Norman Dello Joio (1913–2008)
 Alma Deutscher (b. 2005)
 Franco Donatoni (1927–2000)
 James Douglas (1932–2022)
 Tan Dun (born 1957)
 George Duke (1946–2013)
 Julius Eastman (1940–1990)
 Ludovico Einaudi (born 1955)
 Tanya Ekanayaka (born 1977)
 Roger Evernden (born 1954)
 Mohammed Fairouz (born 1985)
 Morton Feldman (1926–1987)
 Lorenzo Ferrero (born 1951)
 Graham Fitkin (born 1963)
 Carlo Forlivesi (born 1971)
 Nils Frahm (born 1982)
 Ola Gjeilo (born 1978)
 Philip Glass (born 1937)
 Chilly Gonzales (born 1972)
 Henryk Górecki (1933–2010)
 Robert Greenberg (born 1954)
 Christian Grøvlen (born 1990)
 Marc-André Hamelin (born 1961)
 Herbie Hancock (born 1940)
 Ichiko Hashimoto (born 1952)
 Kenneth Hesketh (born 1968)
 Alistair Hinton (born 1950)
 Joe Hisaishi (born 1950)
 Christopher Hobbs (born 1950)
 Stephen Hough (born 1961)
 Abdullah Ibrahim (born 1934)
 Keith Jarrett (born 1945)
 Aivars Kalējs (born 1951)
 Shigeru Kan-no (born 1959)
 Nikolai Kapustin (1937-2020)
 Elena Kats-Chernin (born 1957)
 Pierre Kolp (born 1969)
 Martin Kutnowski (born 1968)
 György Ligeti (1923–2006)
 Ji Liu (born 1990)
 Frederik Magle (born 1977)
 Kento Masuda (born 1973)
 Klaus Mertens (born 1973)
 Fred Momotenko (born 1970)
 Conlon Nancarrow (1912–1997)
 David Nevue (born 1965)
 Luka Okros (born 1991)
 Yukie Nishimura (born 1967)
 Christopher Norton (born 1953)
 Michael Nyman (born 1944)
 Chris Opperman (born 1978)
 Ozymandias (born 1971)
 Michael Parsons (born 1938)
 David Pentecost (born 1940)
 Wolfgang Plagge (born 1960)
 Tomi Räisänen (born 1976)
 Jan Randall (born 1952)
 Anirudh Ravichander (born 1990)
 Dino Residbegovic (born 1975)
 Max Richter (born 1966)
 Diana Ringo (born 1992)
 Arturo Rodas (born 1954)
 Alexander Rosenblatt (born 1956)
 Lee Ru-ma a.k.a. Yiruma (born 1978)
 Frederic Rzewski (1938–2021)
 Ryuichi Sakamoto (born 1952)
 Fazıl Say (born 1970)
 Giacinto Scelsi (1905–1988)
 Avi Schönfeld (born 1947)
 Jon Schmidt (born 1966)
 Salvatore Sciarrino (born 1947)
 Peter Seabourne (born 1960)
 Rodion Konstantinovich Shchedrin (born 1932)
 Yoko Shimomura (born 1967)
 Gregory Short (1938–1999)
 Hugh Shrapnel (born 1947)
 Arlene Sierra (born 1970)
 Howard Skempton (born 1947)
 Dave Smith (born 1949)
 Karlheinz Stockhausen (1928–2007)
 William Susman (born 1960)
 Yuji Takahashi (born 1938)
 Karen Tanaka (born 1961)
 Jennifer Thomas (born 1977)
 Robert Scott Thompson (born 1959)
 Yann Tiersen (born 1970)
 Vladimir Titov (born 1984)
 Julia Tsenova (1948–2010)
 Pēteris Vasks (born 1946)
 Carl Verbraeken (born 1950)
 Carl Vine (born 1954)
 Ezequiel Viñao (born 1960)
 John White (born 1936)
 George Winston (born 1949)
 Yehuda Yannay (born 1937)
 Yanni (born 1954)
 Joji Yuasa (born 1929)
 Yitzhak Yedid (born 1971)
 Isang Yun (1917–1995)
 Yoshiki (born 1965)
 Edson Zampronha (born 1963)
 Joe Zawinul (1932–2007)
 Ralph Zurmühle (born?)

References 

Piano